Massachusetts House of Representatives' 2nd Worcester district in the United States is one of 160 legislative districts included in the lower house of the Massachusetts General Court. It covers part of Worcester County. Democrat Jon Zlotnik of Gardner has represented the district since 2013.

Towns represented
The district includes the following localities:
 Ashburnham
 Gardner
 part of Westminster
 Winchendon

The current district geographic boundary overlaps with those of the Massachusetts Senate's Worcester and Middlesex district and Worcester, Hampden, Hampshire and Middlesex district.

Representatives
 Isaac Stevens, circa 1858
 George Whitney, circa 1859
 Charles W. Conant, circa 1888
 Nathaniel R. Perkins, circa 1888
 Charles H. Hartshorn, circa 1920
 J. Warren Moulton, circa 1920
 J. Philip Howard, circa 1951
 Robert D. Wetmore, 1971-1977 
 Richard M. Bastien
 Jonathan Zlotnik, 2013–present

See also
 List of Massachusetts House of Representatives elections
 Other Worcester County districts of the Massachusetts House of Representatives: 1st, 3rd, 4th, 5th, 6th, 7th, 8th, 9th, 10th, 11th, 12th, 13th, 14th, 15th, 16th, 17th, 18th
 Worcester County districts of the Massachusett Senate: 1st, 2nd; Hampshire, Franklin and Worcester; Middlesex and Worcester; Worcester, Hampden, Hampshire and Middlesex; Worcester and Middlesex; Worcester and Norfolk
 List of Massachusetts General Courts
 List of former districts of the Massachusetts House of Representatives

Images
Portraits of legislators

References

External links
 Ballotpedia
  (State House district information based on U.S. Census Bureau's American Community Survey).

House
Government in Worcester County, Massachusetts